Events from the year 1596 in Ireland.

Incumbent
Monarch: Elizabeth I

Events
 June – Sir John Norreys and Sir Geoffrey Fenton travel from England to Connacht to parley with the local lords.
 An envoy of King Philip II of Spain arrives to make inquiries of survivors of the Spanish Armada in Ireland but is successful in only eight cases.

Births

Deaths
Donald McCarthy, Earl of Clancare, noble.

References

 
1590s in Ireland
Ireland
Years of the 16th century in Ireland